Reflexiones (Reflections) is the 20th studio album recorded by Mexican performer José José, It was released by RCA Ariola in 1984 (see 1984 in music). It was written, produced and arranged by Spanish producer Rafael Pérez-Botija. This album became the first number-one set on the Billboard Latin Pop Albums, received a platinum certification in Mexico for sales of 250,000 units, and at the Grammy Awards of 1986 it was nominated for Grammy Awards for Best Latin Pop Performance losing to Es Fácil Amar by Lani Hall.

Track listing

Personnel 

 Rafael Perez Botija – Arranger, Director, Producer, Direction, Realization
 José José – Interpretation

Chart performance

See also
List of best-selling Latin albums

References

1984 albums
José José albums
RCA Records albums
Spanish-language albums